The Kingfisher Airlines Tennis Open (known as the Kingfisher Airlines Tennis Open for sponsorship reasons) was a professional men's tennis tournament played on outdoor hard courts. It was part of the International Series of the ATP Tour and was held annually in Asia.

History

The tournament was first created in 1996 in Shanghai, China, on indoor carpet courts and as part of the ATP World Series. The second new tournament started by the Association of Tennis Professionals (ATP) in Asia in three years, after the Beijing Open, created in 1993, the Shanghai event ran as a men's only tournament during four years, seeing the likes of Michael Chang, Goran Ivanišević, Marcelo Ríos and Magnus Norman reaching the finals. In 2000, the Tier IV Women's Tennis Association (WTA) tournaments of Beijing was moved to Shanghai, allowing the city to hold both the ATP event, now part of the International Series, and the WTA event.

In 2004, as the ATP was increasing its presence in Asia, having brought the Tennis Masters Cup to Shanghai in 2002, working on moving several events to different new locations, the ATP and WTA Shanghai tournaments were both relocated, with the women's, now a Tier II tournament, returning to Beijing, and the men's moving to Ho Chi Minh City, Vietnam. After the 2005 edition, the tournament moved once more to a new country, in India, taking place in the city of Mumbai first, in 2006 and 2007, and then moving again to Bangalore for the 2008 edition. The first event to be held in the new location, though, was cancelled due to security fears, and the first Bangalore Open consequently postponed to the next season. In 2009 a new tournament in Asia was created to replace it, the Malaysian Open, located on Kuala Lumpur, Malaysia.

Past finals

Singles

Doubles

Notes

References

External links
Official website

 
ATP Tour
Hard court tennis tournaments
Recurring sporting events established in 1996
Recurring events disestablished in 2007
Tennis tournaments in India
Defunct tennis tournaments in Asia
Defunct sports competitions in India